Laureano Sanabria Ruiz (born 22 March 1985), commonly known as Laure, is a Spanish professional footballer who plays for CD Atlético Baleares as a right-back.

He spent the vast majority of his career with Deportivo La Coruña, where he made 213 appearances in all competitions over ten seasons. In La Liga, he appeared in 117 matches for the club.

Club career

Real Madrid and Leganés
Born in Madrid, Laure was a Real Madrid youth graduate whom, despite an impressive season for its C side, did not see Ramón Calderón's board offer him a new contract. He then signed for CD Leganés, also in the Spanish capital and competing in the Segunda División B, where he was a regular during his only season.

Deportivo
After moving to Deportivo de La Coruña in the summer of 2007, Laure quickly went on to establish himself as starter in its reserves, eventually catching the eye of first-team manager Miguel Ángel Lotina who picked him to replace the injured Manuel Pablo against Villarreal CF on 13 January 2008, and he played the full 90 minutes in the 4–3 La Liga away loss. At the end of the campaign, he earned a new deal to stay at the club until 2011.

Laure appeared in 20 matches in 2009–10, mostly as a left-back due to Filipe Luís' terrible ankle injury; Deportivo stood fourth in the table at the moment (January 2010), eventually finishing in tenth position. He scored his only goal in the top flight on 29 January 2011, in a 3–3 home draw with Sevilla FC.

In 2011–12, his first season ever in Segunda División, Laure took part in 38 games for the champions, scoring in the 3–2 home win over Girona FC. He managed another promotion from that level two years later, contributing 36 appearances and one goal.

Alcorcón
On 5 July 2017, Laure signed a three-year contract with AD Alcorcón of the second tier. In September of the following year, he reached the milestone of 50 consecutive complete matches.

Honours
Deportivo
Segunda División: 2011–12

References

External links
Deportivo official profile 

LaLiga profile

1985 births
Living people
Spanish footballers
Footballers from Madrid
Association football defenders
La Liga players
Segunda División players
Segunda División B players
Tercera División players
Primera Federación players
Real Madrid C footballers
CD Leganés players
Deportivo Fabril players
Deportivo de La Coruña players
AD Alcorcón footballers
CD Atlético Baleares footballers